The 1975 All-SEC football team consists of American football players selected to the All-Southeastern Conference (SEC) chosen by various selectors for the 1975 NCAA Division I football season. Alabama won the conference.

Offensive selections

Receivers 

 Larry Seivers, Tennessee (AP, UPI)

Tight ends

Barry Burton, Vanderbilt (AP, UPI)

Tackles 

 Warren Bryant, Kentucky (AP, UPI)
 Mike Williams, Florida (AP, UPI)

Guards 
Randy Johnson, Georgia (AP, UPI)
David Gerasimchuk, Alabama (AP)
Mickey Marvin, Tennessee (UPI)

Centers 
Richard Keyes, Miss. St. (AP, UPI)

Quarterbacks 

 Richard Todd, Alabama (AP, UPI)

Running backs 

 Jimmy DuBose, Florida (AP, UPI)
Sonny Collins, Kentucky (AP, UPI)
Glynn Harrison, Georgia (AP, UPI)

Defensive selections

Ends 
Leroy Cook, Alabama (AP, UPI)
Kenny Bordelon, LSU (AP)
Ron McCartney, Tennessee (UPI)

Tackles 
 Steve Cassidy, LSU (AP, UPI)
Bob Baumhower, Alabama (AP, UPI)
Rick Telhieard, Auburn (AP)

Middle guards
Ben Williams, Ole Miss (AP, UPI)

Linebackers 
 Corley Duncan, Alabama (AP, UPI)
Sammy Green, Florida (AP, UPI)
Andy Spiva, Tennessee (AP)
Woody Lowe, Alabama (UPI)

Backs 
Jay Chesley, Vanderbilt (AP, UPI)
Mike Mauck, Tennessee (AP)
Wayne Rhodes, Alabama (AP)
 Tyrone King, Alabama (UPI)
Alan Pizzitola, Alabama (UPI)

Special teams

Kicker 
David Posey, Florida (AP)

Punter 

 Clyde Baumgartner, Auburn (AP)

Key
AP = Associated Press

UPI = United Press International

Bold = Consensus first-team selection by both AP and UPI

See also
1975 College Football All-America Team

References

All-SEC
All-SEC football teams